Daniel Attias (born December 4, 1951) is an American television director and producer. He is also director of his only feature film Silver Bullet from 1985, based on the novella by Stephen King. Attias' career has spanned four decades, during which he has directed a significant number of popular primetime television programs, including Miami Vice and Beverly Hills, 90210. He frequently works on series for HBO and has directed episodes of The Sopranos, The Wire, Six Feet Under, True Blood, Entourage and Deadwood. Attias has received two Emmy Award nominations for his directing of Entourage.

He was a regular director for the espionage drama Alias. He has also directed two episodes of Lost.

Being of Jewish descent, in August 2015 he signed – as one of 98 members of Los Angeles' Jewish community – an open letter supporting the proposed nuclear agreement between Iran and six world powers led by the United States as "being in the best interest of the United States and Israel."

Isla Vista cases
In 2001, his son David killed five people with his vehicle in the 2001 Isla Vista killings and was ruled legally insane and sentenced to 60 years in a mental institution. He was released in 2012 after serving 10 years. Several eyewitnesses said they heard his son shout "I am the Angel of Death" and other satanic phrases moments after the collision.

A civil case was brought against Dan and his wife Diana, for recklessly permitting their son David to drive their 1991 Saab 9000. That suit was settled confidentially in September 2003.

Director credits

External links

References 

1951 births
Living people
American Mizrahi Jews
American people of Moroccan-Jewish descent
American Sephardic Jews
American television directors
American television producers
Directors Guild of America Award winners
Film directors from Los Angeles
Television producers from California